Francisca María Imboden Fernández, (born July 31, 1971) is a Chilean actress (film, theater and television).

Francisca is the daughter of Juan Carlos Imboden and María Isabel Fernández. Together with her sisters Catalina and Ignacia, she studied at College Français of Viña del Mar, an institution now known as Alliançe Française Jean D'Alambert.

Imboden studied and graduated in theater studies from Pontificia Universidad Católica de Chile, and her professional debut came in the soap opera Oro Verde of TVN in 1997.

She is a columnist for several internet sites, like the magazine "Puntonet", from Terra Networks, in Chile; her pseudonym is "Franca".

Today she is engaged to Chilean architect Pablo Redondo, and the mother of two daughters and a son.

Films

External links
 

1971 births
Chilean film actresses
Chilean television actresses
Chilean telenovela actresses
Chilean people of French descent
Chilean people of German descent
Living people
People from Viña del Mar
Pontifical Catholic University of Chile alumni